Beacon Hill is a hill in the northern part of the Kowloon peninsula in Hong Kong. It is the 71st-highest hill of Hong Kong and is 457m tall. Beacon Hill is located within the Lion Rock Country Park. The tower and its relevant equipment on the top of Beacon Hill is not open to the public and is a secured facility controlled and maintained by the Hong Kong Civil Aviation Department.

Name
The hill's name dates back to the Great Clearance between 1661 and 1669, which required the complete evacuation of the coastal areas of Kowloon in Hong Kong in order to fight against and then subsequently defeat the anti-Qing movement that was first started and largely led by surviving Ming Dynasty loyalists carrying on the struggle against the new Manchu-formed Qing Dynasty. Qing military garrisons were created and stationed throughout most of Kowloon's coastal areas to enforce the Qing government's decree in locations which later became referred to as beacons.

Conservation
The steep north face of Beacon Hill, together with a valley to the north-east of Eagle's Nest, covering a total area of 53.2 hectares, was designated as a Site of Special Scientific Interest in 1979.

See also

Geography of Hong Kong
Eight Mountains of Kowloon
Beacon Hill School, Hong Kong
Beacon Hill Tunnel
Lion Rock
MacLehose Trail

References

Mountains, peaks and hills of Hong Kong
New Kowloon
Sha Tin District